The women's shot put event at the 1974 British Commonwealth Games was held on 27 January at the Queen Elizabeth II Park in Christchurch, New Zealand.

Medalists

Results

Qualification

Final
Held on 27 January.

References

Athletics at the 1974 British Commonwealth Games
1974